Tareq Frank Daoudi Taylor (born 30 July 1969) is a Swedish chef and restaurateur of partly Palestinian origin. He has been a television-chef for SVT in shows like Trädgårdsonsdag along with Pernilla Månsson and Go'kväll, as well as the Christmas Calendar Tusen år till julafton. He has also participated in the summer show Sommarlov for a couple of summers also for SVT. Internationally he is known for his TV-show Tareq Taylor's Nordic Cookery where he explores the Nordic Cuisine.

In 2014, he opened the restaurant Kockeriet in Malmö, where the guests get their food from different stations at the restaurant and help with preparing their own meals. In 2013, he hosted an episode of Sommar i P1 at Sveriges Radio where he talked about his career.

Taylor and his wife were separated in September 2021; together they have daughter Ellen, who in 2015 participated in Sveriges Yngsta Mästerkock, a cooking show for children broadcast on TV4, where she placed third.

Bibliography
Taylor, Tareq; Öhlin Lindeheim Petra (2011). Om mat och kärlek. Västerås: Ica. Libris 12033048. 
Taylor, Tareq; Taylor Kristina, Kroon Peter (2012). Sylta, safta och lägg in. Västerås: Ica. Libris 12751118. 
Taylor, Tareq; Taylor Kristina (2012). Klassiker. Västerås: Ica. Libris 12341635. 
Taylor, Tareq; Taylor Stina (2012). Blomstrande gott. [Sverige]: Slottsträdgårdens kafé. Libris 13987856
Taylor, Tareq; Taylor Stina (2014). Helt Enkelt. Massolit Förlag. 
Taylor, Tareq (2015). Tareq Taylors nordiska matresa. Roos & Tegnér. 
Taylor, Tareq (2016). Mat som gör gott: Ny vardag med Tareq Taylor. Bonnier Fakta. 
Taylor, Tareq (2017) Tareq Taylors kyckling. Bonnier Fakta.

References

External links

 

Living people
1969 births
People from Malmö
Swedish television chefs